Bob and Mike Bryan were the defending champions, but lost to Steve Johnson and Sam Querrey in the first round, making their earliest exit in Grand Slam since 2000 Wimbledon Championships, ending their record streak of winning at least one Grand Slam title every year for the previous 10 years.

Pierre-Hugues Herbert and Nicolas Mahut won the title, defeating Jamie Murray and John Peers in the final, 6–4, 6–4.

Seeds

Draw

Finals

Top half

Section 1

Section 2

Bottom half

Section 3

Section 4

References

External links
Draw
2015 US Open – Men's draws and results at the International Tennis Federation

Men's Doubles
US Open - Men's Doubles
US Open (tennis) by year – Men's doubles